Jane Hutchison may refer to:
 Jane Campbell Hutchison, American art historian
 Jane Denio Hutchison, president of the Tri County Federation of Women's Clubs